Nematollah Nassiri (4 August 1910 – 15 February 1979) was the director of SAVAK, the Iranian intelligence agency during the rule of Mohammad Reza Shah Pahlavi, and later the Ambassador of Iran to Pakistan. He was one of the 438 individuals who were arrested and executed in 1979 following the Iranian Revolution.

Early life and education
Nematollah Nassiri was born on 4 August 1910 in Sangussar, near Semnan. He was a rumored adherent of the Bahá’í Faith, despite denials by the religion of him being a Bahá’í. He received secondary education in Tehran. In 1929, he was enrolled in an army officer school. Nassiri was a classmate of then-Crown Prince Mohammad Reza Pahlavi, which in turn played an important role in his career.

Career activities
Nassiri began his career in the rank of lieutenant of the 2nd class (rank), quickly moving forward in the ranks of the service in the ground forces.

In 1949, with the rank of lieutenant-colonel Nassiri became governor of the province of Kerman.

Nassiri served as the commander of the Iranian Imperial Guards during the Pahlavi dynasty. He was arrested by the followers of Prime Minister Mohammad Mosaddegh when he delivered two decrees of the Shah to the prime minister. A personal friend of the Shah, Nassiri participated in the 1953 Iranian coup d'état which removed Prime Minister Mosaddegh from power in 1953. Nassiri was appointed head of SAVAK following the failure of General Hassan Pakravan, the previous director, to prevent the assassination of Prime Minister Hassan-Ali Mansur on 21 January 1965. Nassiri was also made deputy prime minister. He served in the post until 6 June 1978 when he was dismissed by the Shah. Then Nassiri was appointed ambassador of Iran to Pakistan.

The proximity to the Shah and his entourage allowed Nassiri to quickly become one of the richest people in Iran. By the early 1970s Nassiri was already the richest landowner on the entire coast of the Caspian Sea.

General Nassiri at the head of SAVAK
At the end of January 1965, the Shah appointed him to the post of director of SAVAK, after General Hassan Pakravan was removed from this post due to the fact that under his leadership, SAVAK was unable to prevent the assassination of Prime Minister Hassan Ali Mansur.

In his book SAVAK – the secret police of Shah Mohammed Reza Pahlavi (1957–1979) researcher of the activities of the Shah secret police Vasily Papava so describes the appointment of Nassiri to the post of head of the secret service: “There are several explanations for this appointment. Closest to the truth, probably the following. The Shah was concerned about the growing authority of the left-wing forces in the country, represented by the extremist and terrorist organizations “Mujahedin-e Khalq” and “Fadaiyan-e-Khalq”. Pahlavi, also not without reason, was afraid of the growing authority of the military, especially the generals and senior officers, who became “heroes” after the August revolution of 1953. It should be taken into account that in the period of 1950-1960s, in many countries of the region, as a result of a coup d'état, the military came to power who overthrew the "pro-Western" secular regimes and established a military dictatorship. That is why the shah needed a new leader of the political police who had left the military environment and was well aware of what measures should be taken to protect the throne from usurping power from the army”.

Nasiri was removed from the office on 7 October 1978.

Modernization of the Shah special services
Mohammed Reza Pahlavi gave General Nassiri tough instructions - to restore the effectiveness of the SAVAK secret police and to properly serve the monarch.

General Nematollah Nassiri ideally coped with the task set before him by the shah: in the shortest possible time, a rather complex and comprehensive system of total investigation and denunciation was created, which controlled all aspects of the political and public life of Iran.

The main focus of the activities of the Shah special services was aimed at combating the "red danger". At the same time, in 1968, Nematollah Nassiri showed interest in establishing contacts with the USSR through the channels of special services, in particular in the acquisition of “counter-intelligence equipment” in the Soviet Union.

One of Nassiri’s main achievements as head of SAVAK was the elimination of the Shah’s opponent, General Teymur Bakhtiar, the first director of SAVAK. The development of a special operation plan to eliminate Bakhtiar and its brilliant execution by the SAVAK agents was personally supervised by General Nassiri, directly agreeing with the Shah regarding all the details of this operation. On August 12, 1970, Teymur Bakhtiar was liquidated in Iraq by SAVAK agents sent there.

Arrest and execution
On 6 June 1978, General Nematollah Nassiri was relieved of his post as head of the SAVAK and appointed ambassador to Pakistan. His place was taken by Lieutenant General Nasser Mogadam, who for many years headed the “Department III” SAVAK.

With the constant development of the Iranian Revolution, the Shah ordered the dissolution of SAVAK and Nassiri was called back from Pakistan. He was arrested together with 60 other former officials on 7 or 8 November 1978, including high-ranking officials, such as former director of SAVAK Hassan Pakravan and former Prime Minister Amir-Abbas Hoveyda. When the Shah left Iran on 16 January 1979, Nassiri remained in prison until the fall of Shapour Bakhtiar's government on 11 February.

On 15 February, Nassiri was arrested by revolutionaries and brought to the Refah School with other officials. He was tried in a Revolutionary Tribunal along with 24 other individuals for a total of 10 hours and was charged – without any defence or concrete evidence of guilt – with corruption on earth, massacre of people, torture, and treason. He was sentenced to death and confiscation of property at 10 p.m. and after the sentence was confirmed by Ayatollah Khomeini, he was executed by firing squad at 11:45 p.m.

References

Further reading
 Fereydoun Hoveyda. (1980). The Fall of the Shah. Trans. Roger Liddell. New York: Wyndham Books.
 All Fall Down: America's Fateful Encounter with Iran 

20th-century Iranian politicians
1910 births
1979 deaths
Ambassadors of Iran to Pakistan
Burials at Behesht-e Zahra
Directors of SAVAK
Executed Iranian people
Grand Crosses with Star and Sash of the Order of Merit of the Federal Republic of Germany
Imperial Iranian Armed Forces four-star generals
Military personnel executed during the Iranian Revolution
People executed by Iran by firing squad
People from Semnan, Iran
People of the Iranian Revolution